This is the results breakdown of the local elections held in Extremadura on 8 May 1983. The following tables show detailed results in the autonomous community's most populous municipalities, sorted alphabetically.

City control
The following table lists party control in the most populous municipalities, including provincial capitals (shown in bold). Gains for a party are displayed with the cell's background shaded in that party's colour.

Municipalities

Almendralejo
Population: 23,720

Badajoz
Population: 111,456

Cáceres
Population: 65,758

Mérida
Population: 41,027

Plasencia
Population: 31,201

See also
1983 Extremaduran regional election

References

Extremadura
1983